Gheysi (Persian: قیسی) is a popular type of dried apricot in Iran. It is widespread in the vicinity of Damavand, Amol, Tasuj, East Azerbaijan and Kerman.  The Gheysi fruit can be eaten fresh, dried, or cooked in traditional Middle Eastern dishes, such as the stew khoresh gheysi, as well as in desserts. Gheysi is a common souvenir from Bardaskan.

References

Apricots
Azerbaijani cuisine